The 1941 Bodmin by-election was held on 11 March 1941.  The by-election was held due to the death  of the incumbent Conservative MP, John Rathbone.  It was won by the unopposed Conservative candidate Beatrice Wright.

References

1941 elections in the United Kingdom
1941 in England
1940s in Cornwall
March 1941 events
Bodmin
By-elections to the Parliament of the United Kingdom in Cornish constituencies
Unopposed by-elections to the Parliament of the United Kingdom (need citation)